The J Nassau Street Local and Z Nassau Street Express are two rapid transit services in the B Division of the New York City Subway. Their route emblems, or "bullets", are colored  since they use the BMT Nassau Street Line in Lower Manhattan.

The J operates at all times while the Z, operating as its rush-hour variant, runs with six trips in each peak direction on weekdays. Both services run through the entirety of the BMT Archer Avenue and Jamaica lines, via the Williamsburg Bridge, and the Nassau Street Line between Jamaica Center–Parsons/Archer in Jamaica, Queens, and Broad Street in Lower Manhattan. When the Z operates, the two services form a skip-stop pair between Sutphin Boulevard–JFK and Myrtle Avenue-Broadway. In addition during rush hours and middays in the peak direction, they run express in Brooklyn between Myrtle Avenue-Broadway and Marcy Avenue, bypassing three stations. At all other times, only the J operates, serving every station on its entire route.

The current J/Z descends from several routes, including the JJ/15 between Lower Manhattan and 168th Street in Queens; the KK between 57th Street/Sixth Avenue in Midtown Manhattan and 168th Street in Queens; the QJ between 168th Street in Queens and Brighton Beach in Brooklyn; and the 14 between Lower Manhattan and Canarsie–Rockaway Parkway in Brooklyn. The current skip-stop pattern was implemented in 1988.

History

Before the Chrystie Street Connection 
The Jamaica Line – then known as the Broadway Elevated – was one of the original elevated lines in Brooklyn, completed in 1893 from Cypress Hills west to Broadway Ferry in Williamsburg. It was then a two-track line, with a single local service between the two ends, and a second east of Gates Avenue, where the Lexington Avenue Elevated merged. This second service later became the 12, and was eliminated on October 13, 1950, with the abandonment of the Lexington Avenue Elevated.

The second major service on the Broadway Elevated ran between Canarsie and Williamsburg via the BMT Canarsie Line, started on July 30, 1906, when the Broadway and Canarsie tracks were connected at East New York. As part of the Dual Contracts, an extension from Cypress Hills east to Jamaica was completed on July 3, 1918, a third track was added west of East New York, and express trains began running on it in 1922.

The Brooklyn–Manhattan Transit Corporation numbered its services in 1924, and the Canarsie and Jamaica services became 14 and 15. Both ran express during rush hours in the peak direction west of East New York. Express trains would only stop at Myrtle Avenue, Essex Street and Canal Street, before making local stops afterwards. Additional 14 trains, between Eastern Parkway or Atlantic Avenue on the Canarsie Line and Manhattan provided rush-hour local service on Broadway. When the 14th Street–Eastern Line and Canarsie Line were connected on July 14, 1928, the old Canarsie Line service was renamed the Broadway (Brooklyn) Line, providing only weekday local service over the Broadway Elevated west of Eastern Parkway. The Atlantic Avenue trips remained, and rush-hour trains continued to serve Rockaway Parkway (Canarsie), though they did not use the Broadway express tracks. The 14 was later cut back to only rush-hour service.

On the Manhattan end, the first extension was made on September 16, 1908, when the Williamsburg Bridge subway tracks opened. Broadway and Canarsie trains were extended to the new Essex Street terminal, and further to Chambers Street when the line was extended on August 4, 1913. When the BMT Nassau Street Line was completed on May 30, 1931, the 15 was extended to Broad Street, and the 14 was truncated to Canal Street.

Weekday midday 14 Broadway-Brooklyn Local and midday 15 Jamaica Express service was discontinued on June 26, 1952. Some 14 trains began terminating at Crescent Street on the Jamaica Line in 1956.

Manhattan-bound rush hour skip-stop service between Jamaica and East New York was implemented on June 18, 1959, with trains leaving 168th Street on weekdays between 7 a.m. and 8:30 a.m. Express 15 trains served "A" stations, while the morning 14 became the Jamaica Local, running between Jamaica and Canal Street, and stopped at stations marked "B". Express 15 trains continued to run express between Eastern Parkway and Canal Street, making only stops at Myrtle Avenue, Essex Street, and Canal Street. These stations were as follows:
 All trains: 168th Street • Sutphin Boulevard • 75th Street–Elderts Lane • Eastern Parkway • Myrtle Avenue • Essex Street • Canal Street
 "A" stations: 168th Street • Sutphin Boulevard • 121st Street • 111th Street • Woodhaven Boulevard • 85th Street–Forest Parkway • Elderts Lane • Crescent Street • Cleveland Street • Eastern Parkway
 "B" stations: 168th Street • 160th Street • Sutphin Boulevard • Queens Boulevard • Metropolitan Avenue • 104th Street • Elderts Lane • Cypress Hills • Norwood Avenue • Van Siclen Avenue • Alabama Avenue • Eastern Parkway

Letters were assigned to most BMT services in the early 1960s. The BMT Jamaica services retained their numbers until November 1967. The 15 became the QJ (express), and the 14 became the JJ.

Chrystie Street Connection to 1977 

When the Chrystie Street Connection opened on November 26, 1967, many services were changed. The two local services – the JJ (non-rush hour Jamaica local, and rush hour Broadway-Brooklyn local) – continued as the JJ without any major routing changes. Thus non-rush hour JJ trains ran between Jamaica and Broad Street, while morning rush hour JJ trains ran to Canal Street, and afternoon rush hour JJ trains ran between Canal Street and Atlantic Avenue or Crescent Street. The rush-hour express J was combined with the weekday  Brighton Local via tunnel to form the weekday QJ, running between Jamaica and Brighton Beach via the Jamaica Line (express during rush hours in the peak direction), BMT Nassau Street Line, Montague Street Tunnel, and BMT Brighton Line (local). This service served two purposes:  (1) early AM service from Jamaica prior to the first QJ trains got the equipment to 95th Street in Brooklyn in time for the AM rush, and obviated the need to have early service to Brighton Beach; and (2) in the evening, trains returned from 95th Street in Brooklyn to Jamaica, allowing the QJ to avoid having to run on the Brighton Line in the Manhattan direction post-rush hour.

The next change was made on July 1, 1968, when the Chrystie Street Connection tracks to the Williamsburg Bridge opened. A new service, KK, was instituted that provided skip-stop service from 168th Street/Jamaica along with the QJ in both AM and PM rush hours; because of the limited skip-stop time spans, other terminals for the KK included Rockaway Parkway, Atlantic Avenue, Eastern Parkway and 11th Street.  The KK provided service to 57th Street/6th Avenue, as the B served 168th Street-Washington Heights during rush hours; during non-rush hours, the B began serving 57th Street/6th Avenue. The MM (depicted with a dark green bullet on R27 signage) had been proposed as a supplement to the KK as a local to 57th Street–Sixth Avenue, but was kept as the M and extended from Chambers Street to Broad Street. The  was eliminated, being cut north of Chambers Street and relabeled as an RR variant, and the off-hour JJ was relabeled QJ.  Less than two months later, on August 18, the QJ was extended to Coney Island–Stillwell Avenue. and the D cut back to Brighton Beach during QJ operating hours in order to avoid switching delays at Brighton Beach. On July 14, 1969, afternoon skip-stop service on the KK and QJ was discontinued due to rider complaints.

At the same time, the KK was cut back to Eastern Parkway from 168th Street and renamed the K, and both skip-stop patterns were carried out by alternate J trains between 7:25 a.m. and 8:12 a.m.. J trains making A stops trains stopped at 168th Street, Sutphin Boulevard, Metropolitan Avenue, 111th Street, Woodhaven Boulevard, Elderts Lane, Cypress Hills, Norwood Avenue, Van Siclen Avenue, and Eastern Parkway, while trains making B stops stopped at 168th Street, 160th Street, Queens Boulevard, 121st Street, 102nd Street, Forest Parkway, Elderts Lane, Crescent Street, Cleveland Street, and Eastern Parkway. All J trains would run express between Eastern Parkway and Essex Street between 6:00 a.m. and 9:05 a.m. from 168th Street, and from 3:35 p.m. to 7:00 p.m. leaving Essex Street.

The K was discontinued entirely on August 30, 1976, eliminating the J skip-stop and express service east of Myrtle Avenue in the evening rush hour. Skip-stop service was retained toward Manhattan during the morning rush hour. One-way express service remained west of Myrtle Avenue, for the M was switched to the local tracks at that time. On January 24, 1977, as part of a series of NYCTA service cuts to save $13 million, many subway lines began running shorter trains during middays. As part of the change, J trains began running with four cars between 9:15 a.m. and 1:15 p.m. On May 2, 1977, J trains began running in skip-stop service between Eastern Parkway and Myrtle Avenue. Chauncey Street and Gates Avenue were designated as A stops, while Halsey Street and Kosciusko Street were designated as B stops.

The following table summarizes the changes that were made between 1959 and 1976.

1977 to present

Archer Avenue Line
The J was truncated to Queens Boulevard just after midnight on September 11, 1977, and to 121st Street on April 15, 1985, as portions of the elevated Jamaica Line closed and were demolished. The Q49 shuttle bus replaced service at the closed stations until 1988. On December 1, 1980, AM rush hour skip-stop service was discontinued.

The BMT Archer Avenue Line opened on December 11, 1988, extending the line east from 121st Street to Jamaica Center–Parsons/Archer. The Z train first ran that day, introducing the present J/Z skip-stop pattern. The new Z trains would go skip-stop between Jamaica Center and Broadway Junction (later extended to Myrtle Avenue) during rush hours, then making all J stops to Broad Street. Bus service on several Queens bus routes was rerouted to serve Jamaica Center instead of the 169th Street station several blocks away. The J/Z skip-stop service was touted, in an attempt to relieve some crowding on the IND Queens Boulevard Line, as being faster to lower Manhattan than E, F, and R service. Because the MTA hoped that Queens passengers would transfer to the J/Z from the E, F, and R, every subway car on the J and Zs fleet was completely graffiti-free.

One of the goals of the Archer Avenue project was to make Jamaica Line service as attractive as possible, and as a result, the TA planned to provide a form of express service. The two options considered to speed up Jamaica Line service were skip-stop service, which would have split Jamaica services into two patterns that served alternate stops, and a zone-express service, which would have split Jamaica services into a short-turn local service and a full-length express services. The zone-express option was dismissed in favor of the skip-stop option because its operation has to be very precisely timed so as to not hinder reliability, because service in the outer zone past the boundary of zone express service at Crescent Street or 111th Street would be too infrequent, and because many stations would lose half their service. Outer-zone expresses, after Crescent Street would skip stops on the local track until Eastern Parkway, from where it would run on the express track, stopping at Myrtle Avenue before going straight to Essex Street in Manhattan, skipping Marcy Avenue. Outer-zone expresses and inner-zone locals would have each been limited to frequencies of 10 minutes.

The TA decided to implement skip-stop service with two services labeled "J" and "Z", with lightly-used stops designated as "J" or "Z" stops, and those with higher ridership being all-stop stations. The all-stop stations were Parsons Boulevard, Sutphin Boulevard, Woodhaven Boulevard, Crescent Street, Eastern Parkway, Myrtle Avenue, Marcy Avenue, and all stops in Manhattan except for Bowery, which was to be served by only the M train. Bowery's low ridership did not justify more than one service to stop at the station; the J stopped there evenings, nights and weekends when the M did not operate into Manhattan. The J-only stops while skip-stop was operating were 111th Street, Forest Parkway, Cypress Hills, Cleveland Street, Alabama Avenue, Halsey Street and Kosciusko Street. The Z-only stops were 121st Street, 102nd Street, Elderts Lane, Norwood Avenue, Van Siclen Avenue, Chauncey Street and Gates Avenue. To further speed up service, J and Z trains would run express between Myrtle and Marcy. Trains on the J/Z ran every five minutes, an improvement over their previous headway of eight minutes. Skip-stop service ran to Manhattan in the morning between 7:15 and 8:15 a.m. and to Jamaica between 4:45 and 5:45 p.m.

Midday express service was added with J service continuing to run express in the peak direction between Marcy and Myrtle. Surveys of ridership at local stops found that service could be adequately provided by midday M service. The running time for skip-stop service from Parsons Boulevard to Broad Street was 48 minutes, compared to  minutes for all-local service and 52 for the E. It was expected that 2,250 Queens Boulevard riders would switch to the J and Z. To make J/Z service more attractive, all trains on those lines consisted of refurbished subway cars that were more quiet, graffiti-free, and had improved lighting and new floors. All cars on the J/Z were expected to have air-conditioning by summer 1989.

Express service was not implemented between Broadway Junction and Myrtle Avenue because local service would have needed to be operated between those points in addition to the J and Z. The two terminals for such a service (57th Street and Broad Street) lacked spare capacity, although it was acknowledged that 57th Street on the IND Sixth Avenue Line could be used as a terminal once Manhattan Bridge subway-track repairs were completed.

Queens Borough President Claire Schulman made multiple recommendations about revisions to the service plan for the extension at the MTA's February 1988 board meeting. She recommended that trains should use the express track between Myrtle Avenue and Eastern Parkway to reduce travel times, and that the Chrystie Street Connection be reused for service to the Jamaica Line.

Post-1990 changes
On September 30, 1990, weekend J service was cut back to Canal Street, but it was extended back to Chambers Street in January 1994.

From May 1 to September 1, 1999, the Williamsburg Bridge was closed for reconstruction. J trains ran only between Jamaica Center–Parsons/Archer and Myrtle Avenue. J/Z skip-stop service operated in both directions between Jamaica Center and Eastern Parkway-Broadway Junction. During the closure, B39 bus service over the Williamsburg Bridge was free. The closure was anticipated to last until October 1999, but regular subway service was restored one month ahead of schedule. The project cost $130 million, including replacing the tracks support structure, signal system and other equipment. On September 1, 1999, J and Z trains, which previously skipped Bowery between 6 a.m. and 8 p.m. on weekdays, began stopping there at all times.

After the September 11, 2001 attacks, service on the BMT Broadway Line in Lower Manhattan, as well as all R service, was suspended. J trains were extended beyond Broad Street via the Montague Street Tunnel to replace the R to Bay Ridge–95th Street at all times except late nights, when it only ran to Broad Street and a shuttle ran in Brooklyn between 95th and 36th Streets. J/Z skip-stop service was suspended. Normal service on all three trains was restored on October 28.

On November 20, 2008, in light of severe budget woes, the MTA announced a slew of potential service cuts; among them was the potential elimination of Z service. In May 2009, after the New York State Legislature passed legislation to offer financial support to the MTA, this planned service cut was taken off the table.

In May 2014, all trains began stopping at Alabama Avenue, presumably for the convenience of transit employees who work at the nearby East New York Yard and East New York Bus Depot. In July 2014, the MTA proposed that weekend J service be extended from Chambers Street to Broad Street. The service change went into effect on June 14, 2015.

From June 26, 2017 to April 27, 2018, J and Z trains ran local between Broadway Junction and Marcy Avenue at all times, supplementing the M, due to the BMT Myrtle Avenue Line connection being closed for reconstruction.

In March 2020, skip-stop service was temporarily suspended due to lack of ridership and train crew availability caused by the COVID-19 pandemic. Full service was restored in June 2020. From December 29, 2021, to January 19, 2022, skip-stop service was again suspended due to a shortage of crew members exacerbated by the COVID-19 pandemic.

On July 1, 2022, J service was cut back to 121st Street, and skip-stop service was suspended due to track replacement on the lower levels of the Jamaica Center and Sutphin Boulevard stations. Skip-service to Jamaica Center was restored on September 19, 2022.

On February 26, 2023, J and Z trains begin skipping the 75th Street-Elderts Lane and Woodhaven Boulevard stations on the Jamaica Center-bound side until the Summer of 2023 as part of a 5 phase platform renovation project for both stations as well as accessibility improvements and elevator installation for the latter. The second phase will close the Manhattan-bound platforms for both stops until late 2023. Phase 3 will close down the Jamaica Center-bound platform of the 85th Street-Forest Parkway station for renovations until the Summer of 2024, while Phase 4 will close the Manhattan-bound platform down until late 2024. The 5th and last Phase will see both trains skip the Cypress Hills station in 2025 (it is uncertain if that project will be performed either one platform at a time or both platforms simultaneously). During those phases, J and Z trains will continue to operate skip-stop service between Myrtle Avenue-Broadway and Crescent Street, Brooklyn, but with both trains making all local stops to/from Sutphin Boulevard-Archer Avenue-JFK Airport, Queens, except for the affected stops.

Route

Service pattern 
The following table shows the lines used by the J and Z, with shaded boxes indicating the route at the specified times:

Stations 
For a more detailed station listing, see the articles on the lines listed above.

Stations in green and stations in blue denote stops served by the J and Z, respectively, during rush hours in the peak direction. The J makes all stops at all other times.

Notes

References

External links 

 MTA NYC Transit – J Nassau Street Express
 MTA NYC Transit – Z Nassau Street Express
 
 
 

New York City Subway services